Otto von Böhtlingk (Otton Nikolayevich Byotlingk; 30 May 1815 – 1 April 1904) was a Russian-German Indologist and Sanskrit scholar. His magnum opus was a Sanskrit-German dictionary.

Biography
He was born in Saint Petersburg, Russia. His German ancestors migrated to Russia from Lübeck in 1713. Having studied (1833–1835) Oriental languages, particularly Arabic, Persian and Sanskrit, at the University of Saint Petersburg, he continued his studies in Germany, first in Berlin and then (1839–1842) in Bonn.

Returning to Saint Petersburg in 1842, he was attached to the Royal Academy of Sciences, and was elected an ordinary member of that society in 1855. In 1860 he was made Russian state councillor, and later privy councillor with a title of nobility. In 1862, the American Philosophical Society elected him an international Member. In 1868 he settled at Jena, and in 1885 moved to Leipzig, where he resided until his death.

Scholarship
Böhtlingk was one of the most distinguished scholars of the nineteenth century, and his works are of pre-eminent value in the field of Indian and comparative philology.

His first great work was a translation of the Sanskrit grammar of Panini, with a German commentary, under the title Acht Bücher grammatischer Regeln (Bonn, 1839–1840). This was in reality a criticism of Franz Bopp's philological methods.

This work was followed by:
Vopadevas Grammatik (Saint Petersburg, 1847)
Über die Sprache der Jakuten (Saint Petersburg, 1851)
Indische Sprüche, a series of Sanskrit apothegms and proverbial verses (2nd ed. in 3 parts, Saint Petersburg, 1870–1873, to which an index was published by Blau, Leipzig, 1893)
a critical examination and translation of the Chandogya Upanishad (Saint Petersburg, 1889)
a translation of the Brihadaranyaka Upanishad (Saint Petersburg, 1889)

His magnum opus was his great Sanskrit-German dictionary, Sanskrit-Wörterbuch (7 vols., Saint Petersburg, 1853–1875; shortened ed. (without citations) 7 vols, Saint Petersburg, 1879–1889), which with the assistance of his two friends, Rudolf Roth (d. 1895) and Albrecht Weber (b. 1825), was completed in 23 years.

He also published several smaller treatises, notably one on Vedic accent, Über den Accent im Sanskrit (1843). Also notable are his Sanskrit-Chrestomathie (Saint Petersburg, 1845; 2d ed., 1877–97), and an edition with translation of a treatise on Hindu poetics by Daṇḍin, Kāvyādarśa (Leipzig, 1890). Böhtlingk took up Panini's grammar again, 47 years after his first edition, when he republished it with a complete translation under the title Panini's Grammatik mit Übersetzung (Leipzig, 1887).

It has been suggested that, during the 1860s, Böhtlingk pointed out the periodic nature of the Sanskrit alphabet to the Russian chemist Dmitry Mendeleev and thereby helped him in the formulation of the periodic table. According to this suggestion, Mendeleev's use of the prefixes eka, dvi, and tri (Sanskrit for one, two, and three) to name as yet undiscovered chemical elements may be viewed as an homage to Sanskrit grammar and to the Sanskrit grammarian Pāṇini.

Bibliography
with Rudolph Roth, Sanskrit-Wörterbuch Saint Petersburg 1855–1875.
Sanskrit-Wörterbuch in kürzerer Fassung 1879–1889, reprint Buske Verlag, 1998, 2003,  
Panini's Grammatik 1887, reprint 1998 
Indische Sprüche 3 volumes, Saint Petersburg, Akad. d. Wissenschaften, 1863–65.
Sanskrit-Chrestomathie, reprinted 1967.

Notes

References 
Attribution

Further reading 
 Otto Böhtlingk an Rudolf Roth: Briefe zum Petersburger Wörterbuch 1852–1885. Herausgegeben von Heidrun Brückner und Gabriele Zeller. Bearbeitet von Agnes Stache. Wiesbaden: Harrassowitz 2007.  .

External links 

 
 

1815 births
1904 deaths
Writers from Saint Petersburg
People from Sankt-Peterburgsky Uyezd
19th-century people from the Russian Empire
19th-century German writers
19th-century German male writers
Emigrants from the Russian Empire to Germany
German Indologists
German philologists
Grammarians from Germany
Philologists from the Russian Empire
Honorary members of the Saint Petersburg Academy of Sciences
Recipients of the Pour le Mérite (civil class)
German untitled nobility
History of linguistics
Saint Peter's School (Saint Petersburg) alumni
German male non-fiction writers
German Sanskrit scholars